is a Japanese former ice dancer. He competed with Nozomi Watanabe. They are three-time Japanese national champions. They placed 15th at the 2006 Winter Olympics in Torino.

Results
GP: Champions Series / Grand Prix

With Watanabe

With Habuki

With Tsuzuki

External links

 
 Nozomi Watanabe & Akiyuki Kido Official Site

1975 births
Living people
Japanese male ice dancers
Olympic figure skaters of Japan
Figure skaters at the 2006 Winter Olympics
People from Matsudo
University of Tsukuba alumni
Asian Games medalists in figure skating
Figure skaters at the 1999 Asian Winter Games
Figure skaters at the 2003 Asian Winter Games
Figure skaters at the 2007 Asian Winter Games
Medalists at the 2003 Asian Winter Games
Medalists at the 2007 Asian Winter Games
Asian Games gold medalists for Japan
Asian Games silver medalists for Japan
Competitors at the 1999 Winter Universiade